The 1923 German football championship, the 16th edition of the competition, was won by Hamburger SV, defeating Union Oberschöneweide 3–0 in the final.

For Hamburger SV it was the first national championship, having played in the inconclusive 1922 final and declined the championship. Hamburg would make another appearance in the final in the following season but lose to 1. FC Nürnberg, followed by another championship in 1928, won against another club from Berlin, Hertha BSC. Union Oberschöneweide made its sole championship final appearance in 1923 and would eventually evolve into what is now 1. FC Union Berlin.

Hamburg's Tull Harder was the top scorer of the 1923 championship with five goals, having previously done so in 1922 and, again, in 1926 and 1928.

Seven clubs qualified for the knock-out competition, nominally the champions of each of the seven regional football championships. However, the Western German football championship was not contested in 1923 and a qualifying competition for the German football championship was held instead.

Qualified teams
The teams qualified through the regional championships:

Competition

Quarter-finals
The quarter-finals, played on 6 and 13 May 1923, with the replay played on 20 May:

|}
 VfB Königsberg received a bye for the quarter-finals

Replay

|}

Semi-finals
The semi-finals, played on 27 May 1923:

|}

Final

References

Sources
 kicker Allmanach 1990, by kicker, page 160 to 178 – German championship
 Süddeutschlands Fussballgeschichte in Tabellenform 1897-1988  History of Southern German football in tables, publisher & author: Ludolf Hyll

External links
 German Championship 1922–23 at weltfussball.de 
 German Championship 1923 at RSSSF

1
German
German football championship seasons